Slow Air is the fourth studio album by London-based dream pop band Still Corners. It was released 17 August 2018 by Wrecking Light.

Track listing
All tracks written by Tessa Murray and Greg Hughes:

References

External links
https://www.stillcorners.com/discography

2018 albums
Still Corners albums